Uzbek Napramach is a type of rug that was made primarily in Uzbekistan in the late 19th century. Napramach is the Uzbek word for a small bag and the rug is typically used as a mat to sit upon. In use they are very similar to the Balisht of the Baluch or the Pushti used in Iran. It shows a resemblance to the Yastik rug of Turkey

The Uzbek Napramach was used particularly by nomads in the mountains of Uzbekistan used as a cushion due to its thick texture as well as a mat.

References

Uzbekistani rugs and carpets